Niamh Nic Daéid  is an Irish forensic scientist, and the Professor of Forensic Science and Director of Research at the University of Dundee.

She earned a bachelor's degree in Chemistry and Mathematics from the Dublin Institute of Technology and Trinity College, Dublin, followed by a PhD in bio inorganic chemistry from the Royal College of Surgeons in Ireland.

In 2014, Nic Daéid was appointed as Professor of Forensic Science at the Centre for Anatomy and Human Identification (CAHID) at the University of Dundee, having been an academic at the University of Strathclyde for 20 years, where she rose to be the first woman to earn a personal chair in the Department of Chemistry.

Education and early life 
Niamh Nic Daeid was born in 1967 in Dundee, Scotland.

Career and research 
In 2017 she was appointed as an expert witness for Grenfell Tower public inquiry presenting oral evidence for the Public Inquiry on two occasions.

Honours and awards 
In 2015 she was elected a Fellow of the Royal Society of Edinburgh.

References

Living people
21st-century Irish people
Academics of the University of Dundee
Academics of the University of Strathclyde
Forensic scientists
Women forensic scientists
Alumni of Dublin Institute of Technology
Alumni of the Royal College of Surgeons in Ireland
Year of birth missing (living people)